The 24th World Cup season began in August 1989 in Australia (for men) and Argentina (for women), resumed in November 1989 in the United States and concluded in March 1990 in Sweden.  During this season, the Soviet Union's empire collapsed, leading to the reunification of East and West Germany, the dissolution of Yugoslavia and Czechoslovakia, and many other changes in Eastern Europe, which would have a significant effect on future World Cup seasons.

The overall champions were Pirmin Zurbriggen of Switzerland (his fourth, tying the men's record held by Gustav Thöni) and Petra Kronberger of Austria (her first).  At the end of the season, Zurbriggen retired, as did former women's World Cup overall champions Tamara McKinney of the United States and Maria Walliser and Michela Figini of Switzerland.

Calendar

Men

Ladies

Men

Overall 

see complete table

In Men's Overall World Cup all results count. Pirmin Zurbriggen won his fourth Overall World Cup. He became the second male athlete to win four times. Following Gustav Thöni, who won his fourth Overall World Cup 15 years ago.

Downhill 

see complete table

In Men's Downhill World Cup 1989/90 all results count. Race No. 17 at Kitzbühel saw the first ever downhill-sprint held in two heats.

Super G 

see complete table

In Men's Super G World Cup 1989/90 all results count. Pirmin Zurbriggen won his fourth Super G World Cup in a row!

Giant Slalom 

see complete table

In Men's Giant Slalom World Cup 1989/90 all results count. There were 6 different winners in 7 races. Richard Kröll won two consecutive races (in the first, Alta Badia, he had the starting number 34). Ole Kristian Furuseth won this title for a second year in a row (20 points two times).

Slalom 

see complete table

In Men's Slalom World Cup 1989/90 all results count.

Combined 

see complete table

In Men's Combined World Cup 1989/90 both results count.

Ladies

Overall 

see complete table

In Women's Overall World Cup all results count. After 11 years Petra Kronberger was able to bring back the Women's Overall World Cup to Austria.

Downhill 

see complete table

In Women's Downhill World Cup 1989/90 all results count.

Super G 

see complete table

In Women's Super G World Cup 1989/90 all results count.

Giant Slalom 

see complete table

In Women's Giant Slalom World Cup 1989/90 all results count. Anita Wachter won the cup with only one win.

Slalom 

see complete table

In Women's Slalom World Cup 1989/90 all results count.

Combined 

see complete table

In Women's Combined World Cup 1989/90 both results count.

Nations Cup

Overall

Men

Ladies

References

External links
FIS-ski.com - World Cup standings - 1990

FIS Alpine Ski World Cup
World Cup
World Cup